AGIL Volley is an Italian women's volleyball club based in Novara and currently playing in the Serie A1.

Previous names
Due to sponsorship, the club have competed under the following names:
 AGIL Trecate (1984–1999)
 AGIL Volley Trecate (1999–2001)
 Asystel Novara (2001–2003)
 AGIL Volley Trecate (2003–2012)
 Igor Gorgonzola Novara (2012–present)

History
The club name is an acronym for Amicizia, Gioia, Impegno, Lealtà (friendship, joy, commitment, loyalty) and originally it started as a youth centre designed to help youngsters develop together through sport. The project grew over the years and investment was made to a build sports complex with a beach volleyball field and a multi-purpose sports facility for volleyball, futsal and basketball.

After spending its first years competing in regional tournaments, in 1989 the club started moving through the Italian lower leagues. By the end of the 1990s it was making good progress playing in the Serie A2 until it struggled in the 1998–99 season and was relegated to Serie B1. As four teams renounced to play the Serie A2 in the 1999–2000 season, the club avoided relegation. During that season a new approach was made, with head coach Luciano Pedullà opting to prepare a team of young players with professionalism and commitment to secure investment for the future. The club was promoted to the Serie A1 (highest level) at the end of the 2000–01 season.

Ahead of the 2001–02 season, the club moved its base from Trecate to Novara and Asystel became its main sponsor with club being renamed . In its first season at the Serie A1, the club was runner up after reaching the playoff finals. In the following season it again reached the playoff finals, finishing second. The club made its debut in European competitions by winning the 2002–03 CEV Cup. At the conclusion of the season despite the two consecutive second places in the league, the European title and a guaranteed spot to play the CEV Champions League in the 2003–04 season, the club decided to focus on youth teams. It relocated to Trecate, revived its old name  and conceded its Serie A1 licence and the professional volleyball department to Asystel who established a new team called Asystel Volley. The licence concession meant AGIL was back to the Serie C of the Italian league.

Ten seasons later, in 2013 the club gain promotion back to the Serie A1 and relocated to Novara. In 2014–15 the club won the Italian Cup for the first time. The first Serie A1 title came in 2016–17.

Team
Season 2021–2022, as of February 2021.

Honours

National competitions
  Coppa Italia: 3
2014–15, 2017–18, 2018–19
  National League: 1
2016–17
  Italian Super Cup: 1
2017–18

International competitions
  CEV Champions League: 1
2018–19

  CEV Cup: 1
2002–03

References

External links

Official website 

Italian women's volleyball clubs
Volleyball clubs established in 1984
1984 establishments in Italy
Sport in Novara
Serie A1 (women's volleyball) clubs